The following is an overview of events in 1988 in film, including the highest-grossing films, award ceremonies and festivals, a list of films released and notable deaths.

Highest-grossing films

The top 10 films released in 1988 by worldwide gross are as follows:

Events
 May 25 – Rambo III was released as the most expensive film ever made with a production budget between $58 and $63 million. The film failed to match the box office earnings from Rambo: First Blood Part II (1985). 
 July 15 – Die Hard defies low commercial expectations to gross $141.5 million worldwide. Hailed as an influential landmark in the action film genre, it influenced a common formula for many action films in the 1990s, featuring a lone everyman against a colorful terrorist character who's usually holding hostages in an isolated setting. 
 October 10 – Batman officially commences filming at Pinewood Studios in Buckinghamshire.
 October 27 – E.T. the Extra-Terrestrial is released on VHS and laserdisc; to combat piracy, the tapeguards and tape hubs on the videocassettes are colored green, and the tape itself is affixed with a small, holographic sticker of the 1963 Universal logo (much like the holograms on a credit card), and encoded with Macrovision. In North America alone, VHS sales come to $75million.
 December 16 – Rain Man is released to critical and commercial success and became the highest grossing film of 1988 worldwide with a gross of $355 million. Winning four Academy Awards including Best Picture, it was the last MGM title to be nominated for Best Picture until Licorice Pizza (2021) 33 years later.

Awards 

Palme d'Or (Cannes Film Festival)
Pelle the Conqueror (Pelle erobreren), directed by Bille August, Denmark

Golden Lion (Venice Film Festival)
La leggenda del santo bevitore (The Legend of the Holy Drinker), directed by Ermanno Olmi, Italy / France

Golden Bear (Berlin International Film Festival)
Red Sorghum (Hong gao liang), directed by Zhang Yimou, China

1988 Wide-release films

January–March

April–June

July–September

October–December

Notable films released in 1988
United States unless stated

#
18 Again!, directed by Paul Flaherty, starring George Burns, Charlie Schlatter, Tony Roberts, Anita Morris and Red Buttons
1969, directed by Ernest Thompson, starring Robert Downey, Jr., Kiefer Sutherland and Winona Ryder

A
The Abyss (L'Œuvre au noir), directed by André Delvaux, starring Gian Maria Volonté – (France/Belgium)
Above the Law, directed by Andrew Davis, starring Steven Seagal and Pam Grier
The Accidental Tourist, directed by Lawrence Kasdan, starring William Hurt, Kathleen Turner, Geena Davis and Bill Pullman
The Accused, directed by Jonathan Kaplan, starring Jodie Foster and Kelly McGillis – (Canada)
Action Jackson, directed by Craig R. Baxley, starring Carl Weathers, Craig T. Nelson, Vanity and Sharon Stone
The Adventures of Baron Munchausen, directed by Terry Gilliam, starring John Neville, Eric Idle, Sarah Polley, Oliver Reed, Uma Thurman and Jonathan Pryce – (U.K.)
Akira, directed by Katsuhiro Otomo, voices of Mitsuo Iwata, Nozomu Sasaki, Mami Koyama, Taro Ishida, Mizuho Suzuki and Tesshō Genda (Japan)
Alice (Něco z Alenky), directed by Jan Švankmajer, starring Kristýna Kohoutová (Czechoslovakia)
Alien Nation, directed by Graham Baker, starring James Caan and Mandy Patinkin
Aloha Summer, directed by Tommy Lee Wallace, starring Chris Makepeace, Yuji Okumoto, Don Michael Paul, Tia Carrere, Andy Bumatai and Lorie Griffin
Amsterdamned, directed by Dick Maas, starring Huub Stapel, Monique van de Ven, Serge-Henri Valcke, Hidde Maas and Wim Zomer (Netherlands)
And God Created Woman, directed by Roger Vadim, starring Rebecca De Mornay, Vincent Spano, Frank Langella and Donovan Leitch
Another Woman, directed by Woody Allen, starring Gena Rowlands, Mia Farrow, Ian Holm and Gene Hackman
Appointment With Death, directed by Michael Winner, starring Peter Ustinov (as Hercule Poirot), Lauren Bacall, Piper Laurie, John Gielgud, Hayley Mills and Carrie Fisher
Ariel, directed by Aki Kaurismäki, starring Turo Pajala, Susanna Haavisto and Matti Pellonpää (Finland)
Arthur 2: On the Rocks, directed by Bud Yorkin, starring Dudley Moore, Liza Minnelli and Kathy Bates
As Tears Go By (Wong gok Kaa mun), directed by Wong Kar-wai, starring Andy Lau and Maggie Cheung – (Hong Kong)
Ashik Kerib, directed by Dodo Abashidze and Sergei Parajanov, starring Yuri Mgoyan, Sofiko Chiaureli, Ramaz Chkhikvadze and Konstantin Stepankov (Soviet Union)
Aviya's Summer (HaKayitz Shel Aviya), directed by Eli Cohen, starring Gila Almagor and Kaipo Cohen – (Israel)

B
Bad Dreams, directed by Andrew Fleming, starring Jennifer Rubin
Bat*21, directed by Peter Markle, starring Gene Hackman and Danny Glover
Beaches, directed by Garry Marshall, starring Bette Midler and Barbara Hershey
The Bear (L'Ours), directed by Jean-Jacques Annaud, starring Bart the Bear, Youk the Bear, Tchéky Karyo, Andre Lacombe and Jack Wallace – (France)
Bear Ye One Another's Burden (Einer trage des anderen Last), directed by Lothar Warneke, starring Jörg Pose and Manfred Möck (East Germany)
The Beast, directed by Kevin Reynolds, starring George Dzundza and Jason Patric
Beetlejuice, directed by Tim Burton, starring Michael Keaton, Alec Baldwin, Geena Davis, Catherine O'Hara and Winona Ryder
Betrayed, directed by Costa-Gavras, starring Debra Winger and Tom Berenger
Big, directed by Penny Marshall, starring Tom Hanks, Elizabeth Perkins, John Heard and Robert Loggia
The Big Blue, directed by Luc Besson, starring Rosanna Arquette, Jean-Marc Barr and Jean Reno – (France/United States/Italy)
Big Business, directed by Jim Abrahams, starring Bette Midler, Lily Tomlin, Fred Ward and Michael Gross
Big Time, a musical, directed by Chris Blum, starring Tom Waits
Big Top Pee-wee, directed by Randal Kleiser, starring Paul Reubens, Valeria Golino, Penelope Ann Miller and Kris Kristofferson
Biloxi Blues, directed by Mike Nichols, starring Matthew Broderick and Christopher Walken
Bird, directed by Clint Eastwood, starring Forest Whitaker and Diane Venora
Black Eagle, directed by Eric Karson, starring Sho Kosugi and Jean-Claude Van Damme
Blind Justice, aka Hold My Hand I'm Dying, directed by Terence Ryan, starring Oliver Reed
The Blob, directed by Chuck Russell, starring Kevin Dillon and Shawnee Smith
Bloodsport, directed by Newt Arnold, starring Jean-Claude Van Damme and Forest Whitaker
Bloodstone, directed by Dwight H. Little, starring Rajinikanth
The Blue Iguana, directed by John Lafia, starring Dylan McDermott, Jessica Harper, James Russo, Pamela Gidley and Tovah Feldshuh
La Bohème, directed by Luigi Comencini, starring Barbara Hendricks and Luca Canonici
The Boost, directed by Harold Becker, starring James Woods, Sean Young, Steven Hill and Amanda Blake
Braddock: Missing in Action III, directed by Aaron Norris, starring Chuck Norris, Aki Aleong, Yehuda Efroni and Roland Harrah III
Brain Damage, directed by Frank Henenlotter, starring Rick Hearst and John Zacherle
Bright Lights, Big City, directed by James Bridges, starring Michael J. Fox, Kiefer Sutherland, Phoebe Cates and Dianne Wiest
Bull Durham, directed by Ron Shelton, starring Kevin Costner, Susan Sarandon and Tim Robbins
Bulletproof, directed by Steve Carver, starring Gary Busey
Burning Secret, directed by Andrew Birkin, starring Klaus Maria Brandauer and Faye Dunaway – (U.K./West Germany)
Buster, directed by David Green, starring Phil Collins and Julie Walters – (U.K.)

C
Caddyshack II, directed by Allan Arkush, starring Jackie Mason, Dyan Cannon, Robert Stack, Dina Merrill, Chevy Chase and Dan Aykroyd
Call Me, directed by Sollace Mitchell, starring Patricia Charbonneau
Camille Claudel, directed by Bruno Nuytten, starring Isabelle Adjani and Gérard Depardieu – (France)
Candy Mountain, directed by Robert Frank and Rudy Wurlitzer, starring Kevin J. O'Connor, Harris Yulin, Tom Waits, Bulle Ogier and Roberts Blossom (Switzerland/Canada/France)
Cannibal Tours, directed by Dennis O'Rourke (Australia)
The Cannibals (Os Canibais), directed by Manoel de Oliveira, starring Luís Miguel Cintra (Portugal)
Casual Sex?, directed by Geneviève Robert, starring Lea Thompson, Victoria Jackson, Stephen Shellen, Jerry Levine, Mary Gross and Andrew Dice Clay
The Cat Who Walked by Herself (Koshka, kotoraya gulyala sama po sebe), directed by Ideya Garanina, starring Valentina Ponomaryova, Yelena Sanayeva, Georgi Burkov, Nikolay Karachentsov, Inna Churikova, Nogon Shumarov, Anna Kamenkova and Nikolai Burlyayev (U.S.S.R.)
Celia, directed by Ann Turner, starring Rebecca Smart (Australia)
Chicken and Duck Talk (Gai tung aap gong), directed by Clifton Ko, starring Michael Hui, Ricky Hui, Sylvia Chang, Lowell Lo, and Lawrence Ng (Hong Kong)
Child's Play, directed by Tom Holland, starring Catherine Hicks, Chris Sarandon, Brad Dourif and Alex Vincent
Chilsu and Mansu (칠수와 만수), directed by Park Kwang-su, starring Ahn Sung-ki and Park Joong-hoon (South Korea)
Chithram (Picture), directed by Priyadarshan, starring Mohanlal – (India)
Chocolat, directed by Claire Denis, starring 	Isaach De Bankolé, François Cluzet and Giulia Boschi (France/Cameroon)
The Chocolate War, directed by Keith Gordon, starring John Glover, Ilan Mitchell-Smith, Wallace Langham, Doug Hutchison, Jenny Wright and Bud Cort
A Chorus of Disapproval, directed by Michael Winner, starring Anthony Hopkins and Jeremy Irons – (U.K.)
Cinema Paradiso, directed by Giuseppe Tornatore, starring Philippe Noiret – winner of Oscar, BAFTA and Golden Globe awards for best foreign language film – (Italy)
Clara's Heart, directed by Robert Mulligan, starring Whoopi Goldberg and Neil Patrick Harris
Clean and Sober, directed by Glenn Gordon Caron, starring Michael Keaton, Morgan Freeman and Kathy Baker
Cocktail, directed by Roger Donaldson, starring Tom Cruise, Bryan Brown and Elisabeth Shue
Cocoon: The Return, directed by Daniel Petrie, starring Don Ameche, Wilford Brimley, Hume Cronyn, Courteney Cox and Jessica Tandy
Colors, directed by Dennis Hopper, starring Robert Duvall, Sean Penn and María Conchita Alonso
Coming to America, directed by John Landis, starring Eddie Murphy, Arsenio Hall, James Earl Jones, Madge Sinclair, Shari Headley and John Amos
Consuming Passions, directed by Giles Foster, starring Jonathan Pryce – (U.K.)
Cop, directed by James B. Harris, starring James Woods and Lesley Ann Warren
The Couch Trip, directed by Michael Ritchie, starring Dan Aykroyd, Charles Grodin, Donna Dixon, Mary Gross and Walter Matthau
Critters 2: The Main Course, directed by Mick Garris, starring Scott Grimes, Liane Curtis, Don Keith Opper, Barry Corbin and Tom Hodges
Crocodile Dundee II, directed by John Cornell, starring Paul Hogan and Linda Kozlowski – (Australia)
Crossing Delancey, directed by Joan Micklin Silver, starring Amy Irving and Peter Riegert
A Cry in the Dark (aka Evil Angels), directed by Fred Schepisi, starring Meryl Streep and Sam Neill – (Australia/United States)

D
Da, directed by Matt Clark, starring Barnard Hughes and Martin Sheen
Dadah is Death, directed by Jerry London, starring Julie Christie and Hugo Weaving – (Australia)
Daffy Duck's Quackbusters, directed by Greg Ford and Terry Lennon, voices of Mel Blanc, Julie Bennett, Roy Firestone and B.J. Ward
Damnation (Karhozat), directed by Béla Tarr, starring Miklos B. Szekely (Hungary)
Dancing in the Dust, directed by Henri Duparc, starring Bamba Bakary (Ivorian polygyny film)
Dangerous Liaisons, directed by Stephen Frears, starring Glenn Close, John Malkovich, Michelle Pfeiffer, Uma Thurman and Keanu Reeves
The Dawning, directed by Robert Knights, starring Anthony Hopkins, Hugh Grant and Rebecca Pidgeon – (U.K.)
Days of Eclipse (Dni zatmeniya), directed by Aleksandr Sokurov, starring Aleksei Ananishnov (U.S.S.R.)
Days of Terror, directed by Said Marzouk, starring Salah Zulfikar, Mahmoud Yassin and Mervat Amin – (Egypt)
Dead Heat, directed by Mark Goldblatt, starring Treat Williams and Joe Piscopo
The Dead Pool, directed by Buddy Van Horn, starring Clint Eastwood, Liam Neeson, Patricia Clarkson and Jim Carrey
Dead Ringers, directed by David Cronenberg, starring Jeremy Irons and Geneviève Bujold – (Canada/United States)
Dead Solid Perfect, directed by Bobby Roth, starring Randy Quaid, Kathryn Harrold and Corinne Bohrer
The Deceivers, directed by Nicholas Meyer, starring Pierce Brosnan, Saeed Jaffrey and Shashi Kapoor – (India)
The Decline of Western Civilization Part II: The Metal Years, directed by Penelope Spheeris, documentary featuring Aerosmith, Kiss, Motörhead and Ozzy Osbourne
Die Hard, directed by John McTiernan, starring Bruce Willis, Bonnie Bedelia, Reginald VelJohnson and Alan Rickman
Dirty Rotten Scoundrels, directed by Frank Oz, starring Steve Martin, Michael Caine and Glenne Headly
Distant Thunder, directed by Rick Rosenthal, starring John Lithgow and Ralph Macchio
Distant Voices, Still Lives, directed by Terence Davies, starring Pete Postlethwaite – (U.K.)
D.O.A., directed by Annabel Jankel and Rocky Morton, starring Dennis Quaid and Meg Ryan
Doin' Time on Planet Earth, directed by Charles Matthau, starring Nicholas Strouse, Andrea Thompson, Martha Scott, Adam West, Hugh Gillin and Matt Adler
Dominick and Eugene, directed by Robert M. Young, starring Tom Hulce, Ray Liotta and Jamie Lee Curtis
Dragons Forever (Fei lung maang jeung), directed by Sammo Hung and Corey Yuen, starring Jackie Chan and Sammo Hung – (Hong Kong)
Dream Demon, directed by Harley Cokeliss, starring Jemma Redgrave – (U.K.)
 The Dressmaker, directed by Jim O'Brien, starring Joan Plowright and Billie Whitelaw – (U.K.)
Drowning by Numbers, directed by Peter Greenaway, starring Joan Plowright, Juliet Stevenson and Joely Richardson – (U.K.)

E
Earth Girls Are Easy, directed by Julien Temple, starring Jeff Goldblum, Geena Davis, Damon Wayans and Jim Carrey
Eight Men Out, directed by John Sayles, starring John Cusack, David Strathairn, John Mahoney, Michael Rooker, D. B. Sweeney and Charlie Sheen
The Eighth Happiness (Baat seng bou hei), directed by Johnnie To, starring Chow Yun-fat – (Hong Kong)
Elvira, Mistress of the Dark, directed by James Signorelli, starring Cassandra Peterson
Ernest Saves Christmas, directed by John R. Cherry III, starring Jim Varney
The Everlasting Secret Family, directed by Michael Thornhill, starring Arthur Dignam, Mark Lee, Heather Mitchell, Dennis Miller, John Meillon, Paul Goddard and Anna Volska
Everybody's All-American, directed by Taylor Hackford, starring Dennis Quaid, Jessica Lange, Timothy Hutton, Patricia Clarkson and John Goodman

F
Faceless, directed by Jesús Franco, starring Helmut Berger, Brigitte Lahaie, Telly Savalas, Christopher Mitchum and Stéphane Audran(France)
Far North, directed by Sam Shepard, starring Jessica Lange, Charles Durning and Tess Harper
Feds, directed by Daniel Goldberg, starring Rebecca De Mornay and Mary Gross
A Few Days with Me (Quelques jours avec moi), directed by Claude Sautet, starring Daniel Auteuil and Sandrine Bonnaire – (France)
The First Kangaroos, directed by Frank Cvitanovich, starring Dennis Waterman – (U.K./Australia)
A Fish Called Wanda, directed by Charles Crichton, starring John Cleese, Jamie Lee Curtis, Kevin Kline and Michael Palin – (UK/US)
Flesheater, directed by and starring Bill Hinzman
For Keeps, directed by John G. Avildsen, starring Molly Ringwald, Randall Batinkoff and Kenneth Mars
The Fox and the Hound, directed by Art Stevens, Ted Berman, Richard Rich, voices of Mickey Rooney and Kurt Russell
Frantic, directed by Roman Polanski, starring Harrison Ford, Emmanuelle Seigner and Betty Buckley
Fresh Horses, directed by David Anspaugh, starring Molly Ringwald and Andrew McCarthy
Friday the 13th Part VII: The New Blood, directed by John Carl Buechler, starring Lar Park Lincoln and Kevin Blair
Fright Night Part 2, directed by Tommy Lee Wallace, starring William Ragsdale and Roddy McDowall
The Fruit Machine, directed by Philip Saville, starring Emile Charles, Tony Forsyth, Robert Stephens, Robbie Coltrane and Bruce Payne (U.K.)
Full Moon in Blue Water, directed by Peter Masterson, starring Gene Hackman and Teri Garr
Funny Farm, directed by George Roy Hill, starring Chevy Chase and Madolyn Smith

G
The Gamble, directed by Carlo Vanzina, starring Matthew Modine, Faye Dunaway and Jennifer Beals – (Italy)
Georgia, directed by Ben Lewin, starring Judy Davis – (Australia)
Ghost Town, directed by Richard McCarthy (under the alias Richard Governor), starring Franc Luz, Catherine Hickland, Jimmie F. Skaggs and Bruce Glover
Ghosts… of the Civil Dead, directed by John Hillcoat, starring David Field, Chris DeRose, Nick Cave and Dave Mason (Australia)
The Good Mother, directed by Leonard Nimoy, starring Diane Keaton and Liam Neeson
Gorillas in the Mist, directed by Michael Apted, starring Sigourney Weaver and Bryan Brown
Gotham (aka) The Dead Can't Lie, directed by Lloyd Fonvielle, starring Tommy Lee Jones and Virginia Madsen
Grave of the Fireflies (Hotaru no Haka), directed by Isao Takahata, starring Tsutomu Tatsumi, Ayano Shiraishi, Yoshiko Shinohara and Akemi Yamaguchi (Japan)
The Great Outdoors, directed by Howard Deutch, starring Dan Aykroyd, John Candy and Annette Bening

H
Hairspray, directed by John Waters, starring Ricki Lake, Divine, Jerry Stiller, Sonny Bono and Deborah Harry
Halloween 4: The Return of Michael Myers, directed by Dwight H. Little, starring Donald Pleasence, Ellie Cornell, Danielle Harris and Michael Pataki
A Handful of Dust, directed by Charles Sturridge, starring James Wilby and Kristin Scott Thomas – (U.K.)
Hanna's War, directed by Menahem Golan, starring Ellen Burstyn, Maruschka Detmers, Anthony Andrews, Donald Pleasence and David Warner
Hanussen, directed by István Szabó, starring Klaus Maria Brandauer – (Hungary)
Hatya, directed by Kirti Kumar, starring Govinda and Neelam – (India)
Haunted Summer, directed by Ivan Passer, starring Philip Anglim, Laura Dern, Alice Krige, Eric Stoltz and Alex Winter
Hawks, directed by Robert Ellis Miller, starring Timothy Dalton and Anthony Edwards – (U.K.)
Heart of a Dog (Sobachye serdtse), directed by Vladimir Bortko, starring Yevgeniy Yevstigneyev, Boris Plotnikov, Vladimir Tolokonnikov and Nina Ruslanova (U.S.S.R.)
Heart of Midnight, directed by Matthew Chapman, starring Jennifer Jason Leigh
Heartbreak Hotel, directed by Chris Columbus, starring David Keith
Heathers, directed by Michael Lehmann, starring Winona Ryder and Christian Slater
Hellbound: Hellraiser II, directed by Tony Randel, starring Clare Higgins, Ashley Laurence and Kenneth Cranham (UK/US)
Hero and the Terror, directed by William Tannen, starring Chuck Norris, Brynn Thayer, Steve James and Jack O'Halloran
Hero Hiralal, directed by Ketan Mehta, starring Naseeruddin Shah and Sanjana Kapoor (India)
High Hopes, directed by Mike Leigh, starring Phil Davis, Ruth Sheen and Lesley Manville (U.K.)
High Spirits, directed by Neil Jordan, starring Peter O'Toole, Steve Guttenberg and Daryl Hannah
Hobgoblins, directed by Rick Sloane, starring Tom Bartlett, Paige Sullivan, Steven Boggs, Kelley Palmer, Billy Frank and Daran Norris
Hope and Pain, directed by Yoji Yamada, starring Hiroko Yakushimaru (Japan)
Hot to Trot, directed by Michael Dinner, starring Bob Goldthwait, Virginia Madsen, Jim Metzler and Dabney Coleman
Hôtel Terminus: The Life and Times of Klaus Barbie (Hôtel Terminus: Klaus Barbie, sa vie et son temps), directed by Marcel Ophüls – (France)
The House on Carroll Street, directed by Peter Yates, starring Kelly McGillis and Jeff Daniels
How Poets Are Enjoying Their Lives (Jak básníkům chutná život), directed by Dusan Klein, starring Pavel Kříž (Czechoslovakia)

I
Illegally Yours, directed by Peter Bogdanovich, starring Rob Lowe and Colleen Camp
I'm Gonna Git You Sucka, directed by and starring Keenen Ivory Wayans
Imagine: John Lennon, directed by Andrew Solt, documentary film about John Lennon
The In Crowd, directed by Mark Rosenthal, starring Donovan Leich and Joe Pantoliano
Iron Eagle II, directed by Sidney J. Furie, starring Louis Gossett Jr.
It Couldn't Happen Here, directed by Jack Bond, starring the Pet Shop Boys – (U.K.)
It Takes Two, directed by David Beaird, starring George Newbern, Leslie Hope, Kimberly Foster and Barry Corbin

J
Johnny Be Good, directed by Bud Smith, starring Anthony Michael Hall, Robert Downey, Jr. and Uma Thurman
Judgment in Berlin, directed by Leo Penn, starring Martin Sheen, Sam Wanamaker, Max Gail, Heinz Hoenig, Carl Lumbly, Max Volkert Martens, Joshua Sinclair, Jutta Speidel, Harris Yulin and Sean Penn

K
Kabzaa, directed by Mahesh Bhatt, starring Raj Babbar, Sanjay Dutt, Amrita Singh, Paresh Rawal and Alok Nath (India)
Kamilla and the Thief (Kamilla og Tyven), directed by Grete Salomonsen, starring Veronika Flåt, Dennis Storhøi, Agnete Haaland and Morten Harket (Norway)
Kansas, directed by David Stevens, starring Matt Dillon and Andrew McCarthy
Killer Klowns from Outer Space, directed by Stephen Chiodo, starring Grant Cramer, Suzanne Snyder, John Allen Nelson, Royal Dano, Michael Siegel, Peter Licassi and John Vernon
The Kiss, directed by Pen Densham, starring Joanna Pacuła and Meredith Salenger – (United States/Canada)
The Kitchen Toto, directed by Harry Hook, starring Bob Peck, Phyllis Logan and Edwin Mahinda 
Kung-Fu Master (a.k.a. Le Petit Amour), directed by Agnès Varda, starring Jane Birkin and Charlotte Gainsbourg – (France)

L
Lady in White, directed by Frank LaLoggia, starring Lukas Haas, Len Cariou, Alex Rocco and Katherine Helmond
The Lair of the White Worm, directed by Ken Russell, starring Amanda Donohoe, Peter Capaldi and Hugh Grant – (U.K.)
The Land Before Time, directed by Don Bluth, voices of Gabriel Damon, Candace Hutson, Judith Barsi and Will Ryan
Landscape in the Mist (Topio stin omichli), directed by Theo Angelopoulos, starring Michalis Zeke, Tania Palaiologou and Stratos Tzortzoglou (Greece)
Last Rites, directed by Donald P. Bellisario, starring Daphne Zuniga, Tom Berenger and Anne Twomey
The Last Temptation of Christ, directed by Martin Scorsese, starring Willem Dafoe, Harvey Keitel, Barbara Hershey, Harry Dean Stanton and David Bowie
The Legend of the Holy Drinker (La Leggenda del Santo Bevitore), directed by Ermanno Olmi, starring Rutger Hauer – Golden Lion award – (Italy/France)
License to Drive, directed by Greg Beeman, starring Corey Haim, Corey Feldman, Carol Kane and Richard Masur
Life Is a Long Quiet River (La vie est un long fleuve tranquille), directed by Étienne Chatiliez, starring Benoît Magimel, Hélène Vincent, André Wilms, Daniel Gélin, Catherine Jacob and Patrick Bouchitey (France)
Light Years (Gandahar), directed by René Laloux, starring Pierre-Marie Escourrou (France)
The Little Devil (Il Piccolo Diavolo), directed by and starring Roberto Benigni, with Walter Matthau and Nicoletta Braschi (Italy)
Little Dorrit, directed by Christine Edzard, starring Derek Jacobi and Alec Guinness – (U.K.)
Little Nikita, directed by Richard Benjamin, starring Sidney Poitier, River Phoenix, Richard Bradford and Richard Lynch
Little Vera (Malenkaya Vera), directed by Vasili Pichul, starring Natalya Negoda (U.S.S.R.)
Love and Fear (Fürchten und Lieben|Trois Soeurs), directed by Margarethe von Trotta, starring Fanny Ardant, Greta Scacchi and Valeria Golino – (West Germany/France/Italy)

M
Mac and Me, directed by Stewart Raffill, starring Christine Ebersole, Jonathan Ward and Tina Caspary
Madame Sousatzka, directed by John Schlesinger, starring Shirley MacLaine – (U.K.)
Maison Ikkoku: The Final Chapter, directed by Tomomi Mochizuki, starring Sumi Shimamoto and Issei Futamata (Japan)
Maniac Cop, directed by William Lustig, starring Tom Atkins, Bruce Campbell, Laurene Landon, Richard Roundtree, William Smith, Robert Z'Dar and Sheree North
Mapantsula, directed by Oliver Schmitz, starring Thomas Mogotlane (South Africa)
Married to the Mob, directed by Jonathan Demme, starring Michelle Pfeiffer, Matthew Modine, Dean Stockwell, Oliver Platt, Mercedes Ruehl and Alec Baldwin
Masquerade, directed by Bob Swaim, starring Rob Lowe, Meg Tilly and Kim Cattrall
Memories of Me, directed by Henry Winkler, starring Billy Crystal and Alan King
Men Behind the Sun (hēi tài yáng), directed by T. F. Mou, starring Gang Wang, Hsu Gou, Tie Long Jin, Zhao Hua Mei, Zhe Quan, Run Sheng Wang, Dai Wao Yu and Andrew Yu (Hong Kong)
Messenger of Death, directed by J. Lee Thompson, starring Charles Bronson, Trish Van Devere, Laurence Luckinbill and John Ireland
Midnight Crossing, directed by Roger Holzberg, starring Faye Dunaway, Daniel J. Travanti, Kim Cattrall, John Laughlin and Ned Beatty
Midnight Run, directed by Martin Brest, starring Robert De Niro, Charles Grodin, Yaphet Kotto, John Ashton and Dennis Farina
The Milagro Beanfield War, directed by Robert Redford, starring Rubén Blades, Sônia Braga, Christopher Walken and Melanie Griffith
Miles from Home, directed by Gary Sinise, starring Richard Gere and Kevin Anderson
Miracle Mile, directed by Steve De Jarnatt, starring Mare Winningham and Anthony Edwards
Missing Link, directed by David Hughes and Carol Hughes, starring Peter Elliott and Michael Gambon
Mississippi Burning, directed by Alan Parker, starring Gene Hackman, Willem Dafoe, Frances McDormand, Brad Dourif and R. Lee Ermey
Mobile Suit Gundam: Char's Counterattack (Kidō Senshi Gandamu: Gyakushū no Shā), directed by Yoshiyuki Tomino, starring Tōru Furuya and Shūichi Ikeda (Japan)
The Moderns, directed by Alan Rudolph, starring Keith Carradine, Linda Fiorentino and John Lone
Mondo New York, directed by Harvey Nikolai Keith, starring Joey Arias, Rick Aviles, Charlie Barnett, Joe Coleman, Emilio Cubeiro, Karen Finley, Dean Johnson, Phoebe Legere, Lydia Lunch, Ann Magnuson, Frank Moore and John Sex
Monkey Shines, directed by George A. Romero, starring Jason Beghe, John Pankow and Stanley Tucci
Monsieur le Directeur, starring Salah Zulfikar – (Egypt)
Moon over Parador, directed by Paul Mazursky, starring Richard Dreyfuss, Raúl Juliá and Sônia Braga
Moonwalker, directed by Jerry Kramer, Jim Blashfield and Colin Chilvers, starring Michael Jackson
Moscow Elegy, directed by Alexander Sokurov (U.S.S.R.)
Moving, directed by Alan Metter, starring Richard Pryor
Mr. North, directed by Danny Huston, starring Anthony Edwards, Robert Mitchum, Lauren Bacall, Virginia Madsen and Anjelica Huston
The Music Teacher (Le maître de musique), directed by Gérard Corbiau, starring José van Dam, Anne Roussel and Philippe Volter (Belgium)
My Neighbor Totoro (Tonari no Totoro), directed by Hayao Miyazaki, voices of Chika Sakamoto, Noriko Hidaka and Hitoshi Takagi (Japan)
My Stepmother Is an Alien, directed by Richard Benjamin, starring Kim Basinger, Dan Aykroyd and Alyson Hannigan
Mystic Pizza, directed by Donald Petrie, starring Annabeth Gish, Julia Roberts and Lili Taylor

N
The Naked Gun: From the Files of Police Squad!, directed by David Zucker, starring Leslie Nielsen, Priscilla Presley, George Kennedy and O. J. Simpson
The Navigator: A Medieval Odyssey, directed by Vincent Ward, starring Chris Haywood, Marshall Napier, Paul Livingston and Jay Laga'aia (New Zealand)
Necromancer, directed by Dusty Nelson, starring Elizabeth Kaitan
The New Adventures of Pippi Longstocking, directed by Ken Annakin, starring Tami Erin, Eileen Brennan, Dennis Dugan, Dianne Hull, George DiCenzo, John Schuck and Dick Van Patten (Sweden/United States)
A New Life, directed by and starring Alan Alda, with Ann-Margret, John Shea, Hal Linden and Veronica Hamel
A Night in the Life of Jimmy Reardon, directed by William Richert, starring River Phoenix, Ann Magnuson, Meredith Salenger, Ione Skye, Louanne Sirota, Matthew Perry and Paul Koslo
Night of the Demons, directed by Kevin S. Tenney, starring William Gallo, Hal Havins, Amelia Kinkade, Cathy Podewell and Linnea Quigley
A Nightmare on Elm Street 4: The Dream Master, directed by Renny Harlin, starring Robert Englund, Lisa Wilcox and Danny Hassel

O
Off Limits, directed by Christopher Crowe, starring Willem Dafoe, Gregory Hines and Fred Ward
Oliver & Company, directed by George Scribner, voices of Joey Lawrence, Billy Joel and Dom DeLuise
On the Silver Globe (Na srebrnym globie), directed by Andrzej Żuławski, starring Andrzej Seweryn (Poland)

P
Painted Faces (Cat siu fuk), directed by Alex Law, starring Sammo Hung – (Hong Kong)
Paperhouse, directed by Bernard Rose, starring Ben Cross, Glenne Headly and Elliott Spiers (U.K.)
Pascali's Island, directed by James Dearden, starring Ben Kingsley and Helen Mirren – (U.K.)
Pass the Ammo, directed by David Beaird, starring Tim Curry, Linda Kozlowski, Annie Potts and Bill Paxton
Patty Hearst, directed by Paul Schrader, starring Natasha Richardson and Ving Rhames
Permanent Record, directed by Marisa Silver, starring Pamela Gidley, Michelle Meyrink, Keanu Reeves and Jennifer Rubin
Phantasm II, directed by Don Coscarelli, starring James LeGros, Angus Scrimm, Reggie Bannister and Paula Irvine
Phantom of Death, directed by Ruggero Deodato, starring Michael York, Edwige Fenech, Donald Pleasence and Antonella Ponziani (Italy)
Plain Clothes, directed by Martha Coolidge, starring Arliss Howard and Suzy Amis
Platoon Leader, directed by Aaron Norris, starring Michael Dudikoff
Police Academy 5: Assignment Miami Beach, directed by Alan Myerson, starring Bubba Smith, David Graf, Michael Winslow, Leslie Easterbrook, Marion Ramsey, Janet Jones, Lance Kinsey, Matt McCoy, G. W. Bailey and George Gaynes
Police Story 2 (Ging chaat goo si juk jaap), directed and starring Jackie Chan, with Maggie Cheung, Lam Kwok-Hung and Bill Tung – (Hong Kong)
Poltergeist III, directed by Gary Sherman, starring Heather O'Rourke, Tom Skerritt and Nancy Allen
Pound Puppies and the Legend of Big Paw, directed by Pierre DeCelles, starring Brennan Howard, B.J. Ward, Nancy Cartwright and Tony Longo
Powaqqatsi, directed by Godfrey Reggio, documentary film with no dialogue
The Presidio, directed by Peter Hyams, starring Sean Connery, Mark Harmon and Meg Ryan
The Prince of Pennsylvania, directed by Ron Nyswaner, starring Keanu Reeves, Fred Ward, Amy Madigan and Bonnie Bedelia
Prison, directed by Renny Harlin, starring Viggo Mortensen, Lane Smith, Chelsea Field, Lincoln Kilpatrick and André De Shields
Prisoner of Rio, directed by Lech Majewski, starring Steven Berkoff – (Poland/U.K./Brazil)
Pulse, directed by Paul Golding, starring Cliff De Young, Roxanne Hart, Joey Lawrence and Matthew Lawrence
Pumpkinhead, directed by Stan Winston, starring Lance Henriksen, John D'Aquino and Kerry Remsen
Punchline, directed by David Seltzer, starring Sally Field, Tom Hanks and John Goodman
Purple People Eater, directed by Linda Shayne, starring Neil Patrick Harris, Ned Beatty, Shelley Winters, Thora Birch, Dustin Diamond and Peggy Lipton
Puss in Boots, directed by Eugene Marner, starring Christopher Walken and Jason Connery

Q
Qayamat Se Qayamat Tak (From Disaster to Disaster), directed by Mansoor Khan, starring Aamir Khan, Juhi Chawla, Dalip Tahil, and Alok Nath (India)

R
Rain Man, directed by Barry Levinson, starring Dustin Hoffman, Tom Cruise and Valeria Golino – Academy and Golden Globe (drama) for Best Picture and Golden Bear (for 1989)
Rambo III, directed by Peter MacDonald, starring Sylvester Stallone and Richard Crenna
Rattle and Hum, directed by Phil Joanou, a rockumentary featuring U2
Red Heat, directed by Walter Hill, starring Arnold Schwarzenegger and James Belushi
Rented Lips, directed by Robert Downey Sr., starring Martin Mull, Dick Shawn, Jennifer Tilly and Robert Downey, Jr.
The Rescue, directed by Ferdinand Fairfax, starring Kevin Dillon, Marc Price, Ned Vaughn, Christine Harnos, Ian Giatti, Charles Haid, Edward Albert, Timothy Carhart, Michael Gates Phenicie, Mel Wong and James Cromwell
Return of the Living Dead Part II, directed by Ken Wiederhorn, starring James Karen, Thom Mathews, Dana Ashbrook, Marsha Dietlein, Phil Bruns and Michael Kenworthy
Return to Snowy River, directed by Geoff Burrowes, starring Tom Burlinson, Sigrid Thornton, Brian Dennehy, Nicholas Eadie, Bryan Marshall and Mark Hembrow (Australia)
Robowar, directed by Bruno Mattei, starring Reb Brown, and Catherine Hickland (Italy)
Rocket Gibraltar, directed by Daniel Petrie, starring Burt Lancaster, Suzy Amis, Patricia Clarkson, Frances Conroy, Sinead Cusack, John Glover, Bill Pullman and Kevin Spacey
Roots: The Gift, directed by Kevin Hooks, starring LeVar Burton and Louis Gossett Jr.
Rouge (Jin Zi Kau), directed by Stanley Kwan, starring Leslie Cheung and Anita Mui – (Hong Kong)
Run for Your Life, directed by Terence Young, starring David Carradine, Lauren Hutton and Franco Nero – (Italy)
Running on Empty, directed by Sidney Lumet, starring Christine Lahti, Judd Hirsch, River Phoenix and Martha Plimpton

S
Salaam Bombay!, directed by Mira Nair, starring Shafiq Syed, Hansa Vithal, Chanda Sharma, Raghuvir Yadav, Anita Kanwar and Nana Patekar (India/U.K.)
Salome's Last Dance, directed by Ken Russell, starring Glenda Jackson, Stratford Johns, Nickolas Grace, Douglas Hodge, Imogen Claire and Imogen Millais-Scott (U.K.)
Salsa, directed by Boaz Davidson, starring Draco Rosa, Rodney Harvey, Magali Alvarado and Miranda Garrison
Sathya, directed by Suresh Krissna, starring Kamal Haasan, Amala, Rajesh, Nassar, Bahadoor, Vadivukkarasi, Vaali and Raja Krishnamoorthy (Sri Lanka)
Satisfaction, directed by Joan Freeman, starring Justine Bateman and Liam Neeson
School Daze, directed by and starring Spike Lee, with Laurence Fishburne and Giancarlo Esposito
Scrooged, directed by Richard Donner, starring Bill Murray, Karen Allen, Carol Kane, Alfre Woodard, John Glover and Bobcat Goldthwait
The Secret of the Sahara, directed by Alberto Negrin, starring Michael York and Andie MacDowell
The Serpent and the Rainbow, directed by Wes Craven, starring Bill Pullman, Cathy Tyson, Zakes Mokae and Paul Winfield
Seven Hours to Judgment, directed by Beau Bridges, starring Beau Bridges, Ron Leibman and Julianne Phillips
The Seventh Sign, directed by Carl Schultz, starring Demi Moore, Michael Biehn and Jürgen Prochnow
Shadows in the Storm, directed by Terrell Tannen, starring Mia Sara, Michael Madsen and Ned Beatty
Shakedown, aka Blue Jean Cop, directed by James Glickenhaus, starring Peter Weller and Sam Elliott
She's Having a Baby, directed by John Hughes, starring Kevin Bacon, Elizabeth McGovern and Alec Baldwin
Shoot to Kill, aka Deadly Pursuit, directed by Roger Spottiswoode, starring Sidney Poitier, Tom Berenger and Kirstie Alley
Short Circuit 2, directed by Kenneth Johnson, starring Fisher Stevens, Michael McKean, Cynthia Gibb, Jack Weston and Tim Blaney
A Short Film About Killing (Krótki film o zabijaniu), directed by Krzysztof Kieślowski, starring Mirosław Baka, Krzysztof Globisz and Jan Tesarz (Poland)
A Short Film About Love (Krótki film o miłości), directed by Krzysztof Kieślowski, starring Grażyna Szapołowska and Olaf Lubaszenko (Poland)
Slugs, directed by Juan Piquer Simón, starring Michael Garfield and Kim Terry
Sodoma's Ghost, directed by Lucio Fulci, starring Al Cliver (Italy)
Some Girls, directed by Michael Hoffman, starring Patrick Dempsey and Jennifer Connelly
Soursweet, directed by Mike Newell, starring Sylvia Chang and Danny Dun (U.K.)
Space Mutiny, directed by David Winters, starring Reb Brown, Cisse Cameron, Cameron Mitchell, James Ryan, John Phillip Law, Graham Clark, Billy Second and Rufus Swart (South Africa) 
Spellbinder, directed by Janet Greek, starring Tim Daly, Kelly Preston and Rick Rossovich
Spike of Bensonhurst, directed by Paul Morrissey, starring Sasha Mitchell, Ernest Borgnine, Anne Desalvo, Sylvia Miles, Talisa Soto and Rick Aviles
Split Decisions, directed by David Drury, starring Craig Sheffer, Jeff Fahey, Jennifer Beals and Gene Hackman
Stand and Deliver, directed by Ramón Menéndez, starring Edward James Olmos and Lou Diamond Phillips
Stars and Bars, directed by Pat O'Connor, starring Daniel Day-Lewis
Stealing Heaven, directed by Clive Donner, starring Derek de Lint and Kim Thomson – (U.K.)
Stealing Home, directed by Steven Kampmann and William Porter, starring Mark Harmon and Jodie Foster
Stormy Monday, directed by Mike Figgis, starring Melanie Griffith, Tommy Lee Jones, Sting and Sean Bean
Story of Women (Une affaire de femmes), directed by Claude Chabrol, starring Isabelle Huppert – (France)
A Summer Story, directed by Piers Haggard, starring James Wilby, Imogen Stubbs and Susannah York – (U.K.)
Sunset, directed by Blake Edwards, starring James Garner, Bruce Willis, Malcolm McDowell, Kathleen Quinlan and Mariel Hemingway
Sur (South), directed by Fernando E. Solanas, starring Susú Pecoraro, Miguel Ángel Solá, Philippe Léotard and Lito Cruz (Argentina)
Sweet Hearts Dance, directed by Robert Greenwald, starring Don Johnson, Susan Sarandon, Elizabeth Perkins and Jeff Daniels
Sweet Lies, directed by Nathalie Delon, starring Treat Williams
Switching Channels, directed by Ted Kotcheff, starring Kathleen Turner, Burt Reynolds and Christopher Reeve

T
Taffin, directed by Francis Megahy, starring Pierce Brosnan, Ray McAnally and Alison Doody – (Ireland)
Tales from the Gimli Hospital, directed by Guy Maddin, starring Kyle McCulloch (Canada)
Talk Radio, directed by Oliver Stone, starring Eric Bogosian, Ellen Greene and Alec Baldwin
Tapeheads, directed by Bill Fishman, starring John Cusack and Tim Robbins
The Telephone, directed by Rip Torn, starring Whoopi Goldberg, Severn Darden, Elliott Gould, John Heard and Amy Wright
Tequila Sunrise, directed by Robert Towne, starring Mel Gibson, Michelle Pfeiffer, Kurt Russell, Raúl Juliá and Arliss Howard, J. T. Walsh
Testimony, directed by Tony Palmer, a biographical film of Dmitri Shostakovich starring Ben Kingsley – (U.K.)
They Live, directed by John Carpenter, starring Roddy Piper, Keith David and Meg Foster
The Thin Blue Line, directed by Errol Morris, documentary film about Randall Dale Adams
The Toy from Water the Hills, directed by George T. Miller, starring Henry Thomas and Drew Barrymore (Australia/United States)
Things Change, directed by David Mamet, starring Joe Mantegna, Don Ameche, Robert Prosky and William H. Macy
Tiger Warsaw, directed by Amin Q. Chaudhri, starring Patrick Swayze, Piper Laurie and Mary McDonnell
A Time of Destiny, directed by Gregory Nava, starring William Hurt, Timothy Hutton and Melissa Leo
Time of the Gypsies (Dom za vešanje), directed by Emir Kusturica, starring Davor Dujmović and Bora Todorović (Yugoslavia)
Time of Violence (Vreme na nasilie), directed by Ludmil Staikov, starring Yosif Sarchadzhiev (Bulgaria)
To Kill a Priest (Le Complot), directed by Agnieszka Holland, starring Christopher Lambert and Ed Harris – (France)
Tommy Tricker and the Stamp Traveller, directed by Michael Rubbo, starring Lucas Evans, Anthony Rogers, Jill Stanley, Andrew Whitehead, Paul Popowich and Rufus Wainwright (Canada)
Torch Song Trilogy, directed by Paul Bogart, starring Harvey Fierstein, Anne Bancroft, Matthew Broderick and Brian Kerwin
Touch of Death, directed by Lucio Fulci, starring Brett Halsey, Ria De Simone and Al Cliver (Italy)
Tougher Than Leather, directed by Rick Rubin, starring Darryl McDaniels, Joseph Simmons and Jam Master Jay
Track 29, directed by Nicolas Roeg, starring Theresa Russell, Christopher Lloyd and Gary Oldman
Tucker: The Man and His Dream, directed by Francis Ford Coppola, starring Jeff Bridges, Joan Allen, Martin Landau and Lloyd Bridges
Twins, directed by Ivan Reitman, starring Arnold Schwarzenegger and Danny DeVito
Two Moon Junction, directed by Zalman King, starring Sherilyn Fenn, Richard Tyson, Kristy McNichol, Louise Fletcher and Burl Ives

U
The Unbearable Lightness of Being, directed by Philip Kaufman, starring Daniel Day-Lewis, Juliette Binoche and Lena Olin
The Unholy, directed by Camilo Vila, starring Ben Cross, Ned Beatty, William Russ, Jill Carroll, Hal Holbrook and Trevor Howard
Urusei Yatsura: The Final Chapter, directed by Satoshi Dezaki, starring Fumi Hirano and Toshio Furukawa (Japan)

V
The Vanishing (Spoorloos), directed by George Sluizer, starring Gene Bervoets (Netherlands/France)
Vchera (Yesterday), directed by Ivan Andonov, starring Hristo Shopov and Georgi Staykov (Bulgaria)
Verónico Cruz, directed by Miguel Pereira, starring Juan José Camero and Gonzalo Morales (Argentina)
Vibes, directed by Ken Kwapis, starring Jeff Goldblum and Cyndi Lauper
Vice Versa, directed by Brian Gilbert, starring Judge Reinhold, Fred Savage and Corinne Bohrer

W
War and Remembrance, TV miniseries, directed by Dan Curtis, starring Robert Mitchum, Polly Bergen, Victoria Tennant and Hart Bochner
War Party, directed by Franc Roddam, starring Billy Wirth and Kevin Dillon
Watchers, directed by Jon Hess, starring Corey Haim, Michael Ironside, Barbara Williams and Lala Sloatman – (Canada/United States)
Waxwork, directed by Anthony Hickox, starring Zach Galligan, Deborah Foreman, David Warner, Michelle Johnson and Dana Ashbrook
We Think the World of You, directed by Colin Gregg, starring Gary Oldman, Alan Bates, Max Hall, Liz Smith, and Frances Barber
Who Framed Roger Rabbit, directed by Robert Zemeckis, starring Bob Hoskins, Joanna Cassidy and Christopher Lloyd
Willow, directed by Ron Howard, starring Val Kilmer, Warwick Davis, Joanne Whalley, Jean Marsh and Billy Barty
Without a Clue, directed by Thom Eberhardt, starring Michael Caine and Ben Kingsley – (U.K.)
Women on the Verge of a Nervous Breakdown (Mujeres al borde de un ataque de nervios), directed by Pedro Almodóvar, starring Carmen Maura, Antonio Banderas and Julieta Serrano – (Spain)
Working Girl, directed by Mike Nichols, starring Melanie Griffith, Harrison Ford and Sigourney Weaver – Golden Globe Award for Best Picture (Musical or Comedy)
A World Apart, directed by Chris Menges, starring Barbara Hershey and Jodhi May – (U.K./Zimbabwe)
World Gone Wild, directed by Lee H. Katzin, starring Bruce Dern and Michael Paré
The Wrong Guys, directed by Danny Bilson, starring Louie Anderson, Richard Lewis, Richard Belzer, Tim Thomerson, Brion James, Franklyn Ajaye, Art LaFleur, Biff Manard, Timothy Van Patten, Ernie Hudson and John Goodman
Wuthering Heights (Arashi ga oka), directed by Yoshishige Yoshida, starring Yūsaku Matsuda (Japan)

Y
Yasemin, directed by Hark Bohm, starring Ayse Romey and Uwe Bohm
Young Einstein, directed by and starring Yahoo Serious – (Australia)
Young Guns, directed by Christopher Cain, starring Emilio Estevez, Kiefer Sutherland, Lou Diamond Phillips, Charlie Sheen, Dermot Mulroney and Casey Siemaszko

Z
Zombi 3, directed by Lucio Fulci and Bruno Mattei, starring Deran Sarafian (Italy)

Births
 January 3 - Karl Glusman, American actor
 January 7 – Haley Bennett, American actress and singer
 January 12 – Andrew Lawrence, American actor
 January 14 - Tom Rosenthal (actor), English actor, comedian and writer
 January 21 - John Early (comedian), American comedian and actor
 February 2
Amadou Ly, Sengalese-born actor, writer and producer
Zosia Mamet, American actress and musician
 February 6 – Anna Diop, Senegalese-born American actress
 February 11 - Jazz Raycole, American actress
 February 12 - Afshan Azad, British actress, model and media personality
 February 13
Ferdinand Kingsley, British actor
Erica Mendez, American voice actress
 February 17 – Nagita Slavina, Indonesian actress, television host, film producer, and singer
 February 18 - Sarah Sutherland, Canadian-American actress
 February 20 – Rihanna, Barbadian singer, songwriter and actress
 February 29
Reilly Dolman, Canadian actor
Langston Fishburne, American actor
 March 4
Josh Bowman, English actor
Cody Longo, American actor (died 2023)
 March 14 – Stephen Curry, American basketball player
 March 21 - Kevin Guthrie, Scottish actor
 March 25 - Erik Knudsen, Canadian actor
 March 27 – Brenda Song, American actress, singer and model
 March 27 – Holliday Grainger, English actress
 April 2 - Jesse Plemons, American actor
 April 6 – Mike Bailey, English actor
 April 10 – Haley Joel Osment, American actor
 April 13 - Katie Lucas, American actress and writer
 April 14
Ben Lloyd-Hughes, British actor
Chris Wood, American actor
 April 18 – Allison Williams, American actress
 April 18 – Vanessa Kirby, English actress
 April 21 - Robbie Amell, Canadian actor and producer
 April 23 – Carla Quevedo, Argentine actress
 April 25
 Jonathan Bailey, English actor
 Sara Paxton, American singer and actress
 April 27
Lizzo, American singer, actress, and flautist
Regé-Jean Page, British actor
 April 30 – Ana de Armas, Cuban-Spanish actress
 May 1 – Anushka Sharma, Indian actress
 May 2 - Laura Brent, Australian actress
 May 17 – Nikki Reed, American actress and writer
 June 2 – Awkwafina, American actress, comedian, writer, producer and rapper
 June 4 – Li Man, Chinese actress
 June 5 – Nuh Omar, Pakistani writer and director
 June 7 – Michael Cera, Canadian actor
 June 9
 Lauren Landa, American voice actress
 Mae Whitman, American actress
 June 13 - Cody Walker (actor), American actor
 June 14 - Dayo Okeniyi, Nigerian-American actor
 June 16 - Jonny Weston, American actor
 June 22 - Shefali Chowdhury, British actress
 June 23
Pippa Bennett-Warner, British actress
Isabella Leong, Hong Kong singer, actress and model
 July 2 - Edward Randell, English musician and actor
 July 7 - Jack Whitehall, English actor, comedian, presenter and writer
 July 10 - Pavlo Lee, Ukrainian actor (died 2022)
 July 12 – Christine Marie Cabanos, American voice actress
 July 13 - Chris Sheffield, American actor
 July 14 - Elise Gatien, Canadian actress
 July 15 - Aimee Carrero, Dominican-born American actress
 July 18 - Chen Tang (actor), Chinese-American actor
 July 19 – Cherami Leigh, American voice actress
 July 20 - Julianne Hough, American dancer, actress, singer and songwriter
 July 25 - Mamoudou Athie, Mauritanian-American actor and producer
 July 26 - Francia Raisa, American actress
 July 30 - Nico Tortorella, American actor and model
 July 31 - Charlie Carver, American actor
 August 1 - Max Carver, American actor
 August 16
Kevin Schmidt, American actor
Rumer Willis, American actress
 August 24 – Rupert Grint, English actor
 August 26 - Evan Ross, American actor and musician
 August 27 – Alexa PenaVega, American actress and singer
 September 12
Matt Martians, American record producer
Clara Paget, British actress
 September 17 - Ritu Arya, English actress
 September 22 – Sana Saeed, Indian actress
 September 26 - Lilly Singh, Canadian comedian, former talk show host and YouTuber
 September 28 - Hana Mae Lee, American actress, model and comedian
 October 1 - Nick Whitaker, American actor
 October 3 – Alicia Vikander, Swedish actress
 October 4 – Melissa Benoist, American actress, singer and dancer
 October 6 - Everlyn Sampi, Australian actress
 October 18 – Tessa Schram, Dutch actress and director
 October 21
Glen Powell, American actor, writer and producer
Mark Rendall, Canadian actor
 October 23 - Ritesh Rajan, American actor
 October 28 - Edd Gould, British animator, artist, writer, director and voice actor (died 2012)
 October 29 – Devon Murray, Irish actor
 November 6 – Emma Stone, American actress
 November 9
Nikki Blonsky, American singer and actress
Alexandrea Owens-Sarno, American actress
Lio Tipton (credited as Analeigh Tipton up to 2021), American model and actress
 November 17 - Justin Cooper (actor), American producer and former child actor
 November 22 – Jamie Campbell Bower, English actor and singer
 November 26 - Tamsin Egerton, English actress
 November 30 - Rebecca Rittenhouse, American actress
 December 1
Nadia Hilker, German actress and model
Zoe Kravitz, American actress
 December 2 – Alfred Enoch, English actor
 December 7 – Emily Browning, Australian actress
 December 14 – Vanessa Hudgens, American actress and singer
 December 15 - Gregg Chillin, English actor and writer
 December 16
Anna Popplewell, English actress
Park Seo-joon, South Korean actor
 December 17 – Rin Takanashi, Japanese actress and model
 December 21 - Shelley Regner, American actress and singer

Deaths

Film debuts 
Joe Alaskey – Who Framed Roger Rabbit
Tim Allen – Tropical Snow
Daniel Baldwin – Too Good to Be True
Stephen Baldwin – Homeboy
Ned Bellamy – The Night Before
Annette Bening – The Great Outdoors
Reg E. Cathey – Funny Farm
Macaulay Culkin – Rocket Gibraltar
Matt Damon – Mystic Pizza
Stacey Dash – Moving
David Duchovny – Working Girl
Kevin Dunn – Mississippi Burning
Nora Dunn – Working Girl
Colm Feore – Iron Eagle II
Cuba Gooding, Jr. – Coming to America
Clark Gregg – Things Change
Danielle Harris – Halloween 4: The Return of Michael Myers
Neil Patrick Harris – Clara's Heart
Robin Harris – I'm Gonna Git You Sucka
Bonnie Hunt – Rain Man
Felicity Huffman – Things Change
David Hyde Pierce – Bright Lights, Big City
Milla Jovovich – Two Moon Junction
Jane Lynch – Vice Versa
Jenifer Lewis – Beaches
Juliette Lewis – My Stepmother Is an Alien
Marc Macaulay – Graverobbers
Mick Molloy – Backstage
Dermot Mulroney – Sunset
Bill Nunn – School Daze
Clive Owen – Vroom
Vincent Pastore – Black Roses
Harold Perrineau – Shakedown
Matthew Perry – A Night in the Life of Jimmy Reardon
Oliver Platt – Married to the Mob
Alan Rickman – Die Hard
Julia Roberts – Satisfaction
Stephen Root – Crocodile Dundee II
Richard Schiff – Medium Straight
Steven Seagal – Above the Law
Lili Taylor – She's Having a Baby
Benicio del Toro – Big Top Pee-wee
Gregory Alan Williams – Above the Law

See also
 List of American films of 1988
 List of British films of 1988
 List of French films of 1988
 List of German films of the 1980s
 List of Bollywood films of 1988
 List of Italian films of 1988
 List of Japanese films of 1988r
 List of Swedish films of the 1980s

References

External links 
1988 Domestic Grosses at Box Office Mojo
Top 1988 Movies at the Domestic Box Office at The Numbers
Top 1988 Movies at the International Box Office at The Numbers
Top 1988 Movies at the Worldwide Box Office at The Numbers
Top-US-Grossing Titles Released 1988-01-01 to 1988-12-31 at IMDb
Most Popular Feature Films Released 1988-01-01 to 1988-12-31 at IMDb

 
Film by year